This is a list of fictional dogs in comics and is a subsidiary to the list of fictional dogs. It is a collection of various dogs in comics.

Comics

See other fictional dogs at List of fictional dogs.

Sources
  Some of the prose in this article was copied from http://www.lingerandlook.com/Names/DogsallList.php and related pages, which are available under the Creative Commons Attribution-Share Alike 3.0 Unported license and the GNU Free Documentation License.

References 

Dogs
 Comics
Dogs